Juniperus oxycedrus, vernacularly called Cade, cade juniper, prickly juniper, prickly cedar, or sharp cedar, is a species of juniper, native across the Mediterranean region from Morocco and Portugal, north to southern France, east to westernmost Iran, and south to Lebanon and Israel, growing on a variety of rocky sites from sea level up to  in elevation. The specific epithet oxycedrus means "sharp cedar" and this species may have been the original cedar or cedrus of the ancient Greeks.

Description
It is usually dioecious, with separate male and female plants. The seed cones are berry-like, green ripening in 18 months to orange-red with a variable pink waxy coating; they are spherical,  diameter, and have three or six fused scales in 1–2 whorls, three of the scales with a single seed. The seeds are dispersed when birds eat the cones, digesting the fleshy scales and passing the hard seeds in their droppings.

As to be expected from the wide range, J. oxycedrus is very variable. One recent study splits it into three species, though other authorities do not accept this:
Juniperus oxycedrus L. – Western prickly juniper. Southwest Europe, in eastern Portugal and Spain east to southern France, northwest Italy, Corsica, and Sardinia, and northwest Africa from Morocco east to Tunisia. Leaves long, narrow-based; cones smooth.
Juniperus navicularis Gand. (syn. J. oxycedrus subsp. transtagana) – Portuguese prickly juniper. Coastal southwest Portugal. Leaves short; cones smooth.
Juniperus deltoides R.P.Adams – Eastern prickly juniper. Central Italy east to Iran and Israel. Leaves long, broad-based; cones with raised scale edges.

Subspecies
An additional variety or subspecies J. oxycedrus var. badia H.Gay (syn. J. oxycedrus subsp. badia (H.Gay) Debeaux) is distinguished on the basis of larger cones ( diameter), tinged purple when mature; it is described from northern Algeria, and also reported from Portugal and Spain.

A further species Juniperus macrocarpa, confined to Mediterranean coastal sands, is more distinct but has also often been treated as a subspecies of prickly juniper, as J. oxycedrus subsp. macrocarpa; it differs in the broader leaves ( wide), and larger cones ( wide).

Other close relatives of J. oxycedrus include Juniperus brevifolia on the Azores, Juniperus cedrus on the Canary Islands and Juniperus formosana in eastern Asia.

Uses
Cade oil is the essential oil obtained through destructive distillation of the wood of this shrub. It is a dark, aromatic oil with a strong smoky smell which is used in some cosmetics and (traditional) skin treatment drugs, as well as incense. Cade oil has, on rare occasions, caused severe allergic reactions in infants.

References

External links
Juniperus oxycedrus - information, genetic conservation units and related resources. European Forest Genetic Resources Programme (EUFORGEN)

oxycedrus
Flora of Europe
Flora of North Africa
Flora of Western Asia
Trees of Mediterranean climate
Least concern plants
Plants described in 1753
Taxa named by Carl Linnaeus
Dioecious plants
Flora of the Mediterranean Basin